Laura Tidball-Balisky (born 2 March 1964) is a Canadian equestrian. She competed in the team jumping event at the 1988 Summer Olympics.

References

External links
 

1964 births
Living people
Canadian female equestrians
Olympic equestrians of Canada
Equestrians at the 1988 Summer Olympics
Pan American Games medalists in equestrian
Pan American Games gold medalists for Canada
Equestrians at the 1987 Pan American Games
Sportspeople from Vancouver
Medalists at the 1987 Pan American Games
20th-century Canadian women
21st-century Canadian women